James Verschoyle,  LL.D. (1747-1834) was an Irish Anglican bishop.

Educated at Trinity College, Dublin, he was successively Archdeacon of Glendalough, Dean of St Patrick's Cathedral, Dublin  and Bishop of Killala and Achonry.

He died in April 1834.

References

1747 births
Alumni of Trinity College Dublin
Irish Anglicans
Archdeacons of Glendalough
Deans of St. Patrick's Cathedral, Dublin
1834 deaths
Bishops of Killala and Achonry
Irish people of Dutch descent